Colin Friels (born 25 September 1952) is a Scottish-born Australian actor of theatre, TV and film and presenter

Early life
Friels was born in Kilwinning, Ayrshire, Scotland. His mother was a mill worker and French polisher, and his father a carpenter. He lived in Kilbirnie until 1963, when his family moved to Australia, arriving in Darwin, Northern Territory before settling in the Melbourne suburb of Bentleigh. He worked as a bricklayer's labourer before studying at the National Institute of Dramatic Art (NIDA), graduating in 1976 along with Linden Wilkinson and Michael Siberry.

Acting career
Friels career began with work mostly in theatre and television. In 1980 Friels was a presenter on the Australian version of Play School, the series for young children. His first film role was in the unreleased Prisoners (1981), appearing with David Hemmings and Tatum O'Neal. His first appearance in a released film was in Hoodwink (1981), alongside his future wife, Judy Davis.

In 1986, he played the title role in Malcolm, about a shy mechanical genius, for which he was awarded the 1986 AFI Award for Best Actor. Friels was also nominated for the Best Actor award the following year, for his role in Ground Zero, but did not win: the film received mixed reviews, with one describing him as "a proficient enough actor, but...miscast". Friels later won another AFI Award in 1995 for his starring role in the 1994 Halifax f.p. telemovie Hard Corps. Friels has played a wide range of other roles. He was a megalomaniac corporate executive in the 1990 feature film Darkman.

From 1996 to 1999, he played Frank Holloway on Water Rats, a role which won him the Logie Award for Most Outstanding Actor at the 1997 awards. In his acceptance speech he said, "I'm very flattered for this and it's all rather silly, isn't it? So, thank you very much."

Since 2003, Friels has appeared as the main character in the BlackJack series of telemovies. In 2010 he also starred in Killing Time where he played notorious underworld figure Lewis Moran. In 2018 he played Tony Ballantyne in the TV miniseries Mystery Road, again opposite Judy Davis.

In 2021, Friels appeared as Jack Ramsay in the second season of the ABC series Total Control, a Coalition MP facing off against independent candidate Alex Irving.

Personal life

Friels has been married to actress Judy Davis since 1984; the couple have two children, Jack and Charlotte. Their relationship was briefly in the media when an argument led to a domestic violence court order against Friels: however, they remained together.

In late 1997, Friels was diagnosed with pancreatic cancer. However, his treatment was successful, and he is one of the very few sufferers of this disease to go into long-term remission. During his treatment he continued to work on the set of Water Rats, until eventually the impact of the chemotherapy stopped him working, and he chose to have his character written out of the series by sending him on a sailing journey around the world. At this time, however, he also continued his stage work, and was performing in Sydney Theatre Company's Macbeth.

Political views 
Friels believes that social and political awareness comes with acting, and is known for his engagement in policy debates, including industrial issues such as workplace relations and free trade. He publicly criticised Bush administration policy in the Middle East, and supported the Sydney Peace Foundation. His engagement with social issues has been evident in his acting work, with two prominent examples being his lead role in Ground Zero, in which he played a cameraman investigating British nuclear testing in South Australia, and his appearance in the ABC television drama Bastard Boys, in which he played union official John Coombs.

Filmography

Film
 Big Toys (TV movie) (1980) 
 Hoodwink (1981) – Robert
 Monkey Grip (1982) – Javo
 Prisoners (1982) - Nick
 Buddies (1983) – Mike
 The Coolangatta Gold (aka The Gold & the Glory) (1984) – Adam Lucas
 The Man in the Iron Mask (animated) (1985) - Phillipe (voice)
 Kangaroo (1986) – Richard Somers
 Malcolm (1986) – Malcolm Hughes
 Ground Zero (1987) – Harvey Denton
 Warm Nights on a Slow Moving Train (1988) - The Man
 Grievous Bodily Harm (1988) - Tom Stewart
 High Tide (1988) – Mick
 Darkman (1990) – Louis Strack Jr
 Weekend with Kate (1990) – Richard Muir
 Class Action (1991) – Michael Grazier
 Dingo (1992) – John ‘Dingo’ Anderson
 The Last Man Hanged (1992) - Ronald Ryan
 The Nostradamus Kid (1993) - American Preacher
 The Burning Piano: A Portrait of Patrick White (TV movie) (1993)
 A Good Man in Africa (1994) – Morgan Leafy
 Angel Baby (1995) – Morris
 Back of Beyond (1995) - Connor
 Cosi (1996) – Errol Grier
 Mr. Reliable (aka My Entire Life) (1996) – Wally Mellish
 Dark City (1998) – Eddie Walenski
 Marriage Acts (TV movie) (2000) - David McKinnon
 The Man Who Sued God (2001) – David Myers
 My Husband, My Killer (TV movie) (2001) - Bob Inkster
 Child Star: The Shirley Temple Story (TV movie) (2001) - George Temple
 Black and White (2002) – Father Tom Dixon
 Temptation (TV movie) (2003) - Robert Francobelli
 Max’s Dreaming (2003) - Mark Bryce
 BlackJack (2003-2007) – Jack Kempson
 The Mystery of Natalie Wood (2004) - Nick Gurdin
 Tom White (2004) – Tom White
 The Illustrated Family Doctor (2005) - Ray Gill
 Solo (2006) - Jack Barrett
 The Book of Revelation (2006) - Olsen
 Bom Bali (documentary film) (2006) - Narrator
 The Informant (TV movie) (2008) – Doug Lamont
 Australia: Land of Parrots (documentary film) (2008) - Narrator
 Blind Company (2009) - Geoff Brewster
 Matching Jack (2010) - Professor Nelson
 The Nothing Men (2010) - Jack Simpson
 Tomorrow, When The War Began (2010) - Dr Clements
 A Heartbeat Away (2011) - Mayor Riddick
 Ned’s Head (TV movie) (2011) - Narrator
 The Eye of the Storm (2011) – Athol Shreve
 The Man Who Jumped (2011) - Narrator
 Mabo (documentary film) (2012) - Justice Moynihan
 Jack Irish: Bad Debts (2012) - Garth Bruce
 The Turning (Segment: Ash Wednesday) (2013) - Narrator
 Schapelle (2013) - Mick Corby
 Interceptor (2022) - Frank Collins

Short films
 The Cavity Caper (1979)
 Distinguished Guests (1983) - Christopher
 Lest We Forget (2010) - Sam
 Sweat (2013) - Ramon, the farmer
 The Crossing (2016) - The Captain
 Snared (2017)
 “Fences” (2022)

Television
 Play School (1980-81) - Presenter
 For the Term of His Natural Life (1983) - Rufus Dawes/Richard Devine (3 episodes)
 Police Rescue  (1992) – Lew Campbell (1 episode)
 Seven Deadly Sins (Episode: Pride) (miniseries) (1993) - Roger Pascoe (1 episode)
 Stark (1993) – Sly Morgan (3 episodes)
 Halifax f.p. (1995) – Kevin Tait (1 episode)
 Space: Above and Beyond (1995) – Lt. Colonel Fouts (1 episode)
 Water Rats – Frank Holloway (1996-99) (91 episodes)
 The Farm (miniseries) (2001) - Tom Cooper (3 episodes)
 Life at 1 (documentary miniseries) (2006) - Narrator (2 episodes)
 Bastard Boys (2007) – John Coombs
 Air Australia (miniseries) (2007) - Narrator
 Gangs of Oz (2009) – Narrator
 Killing Time (2010) – Lewis Moran (8 episodes)
 Wild Boys (TV series) (2011) - Mad Dog Morgan (1 episode)
 Sydney Sailboat aka Bubble Bath Bay (2015) - Terry the Tug (voice)
 Go Back to Where You Came From (2015) - Narrator (3 episodes)
 Changed Forever:The Making of Australia (miniseries) (2016) - Narrator
 DNA Nation (2016) - Narrator (3 episodes)
 The Secret Daughter (2016) - Jack Norton
 First Contact (2016) - Narrator (3 episodes)
 Filthy Rich and Homeless (2017-20) - Narrator
 Mystery Road (2018) – Tony Ballantyne (6 episodes)
 Total Control (2019) - Jack Ramsay MP (6 episodes)
 Wakefield (miniseries) (2021) - Baz Madden (1 episode)
 Pieces of Her (2022) - Older Eli Wexler
 Underbelly: Vanishing Act (miniseries) (2022) - George K

Theatre

 Macbeth (1977) - Macduff (STCSA)
 Annie Get Your Gun (1977) (STCSA)
 Henry IV, Part 1 & Henry IV, Part 2 (1978) - Poins (STCSA)
 A Manual of Trench Warfare (1978) - Barry Moon (STCSA / Seymour Centre)
 The Les Darcy Show (1978) - Les Darcy (STCSA)
 Cedoona (1978) (STCSA)
 Cymbeline (1978) - Cloten (STCSA)
 The Caucasian Chalk Circle (1979) (Sydney Theatre Company)
 Oresteia (1980) - Orestes (Nimrod)
 Hamlet (1981) - Hamlet (Sydney Theatre Company)
 Inside the Island (1980) (Nimrod)
 The Man from Mukinupin (1981) - Harry / Jack (Sydney Theatre Company)
 Butterflies of Kalimantan (1982) (Women in Arts Festival)
 King Lear (1984) - Edmund (Nimrod)
 Il Magnifico (1985) - Lorenzo Medici (Nimrod)
 Sweet Bird of Youth (1985) - Chance Wayne (Davis Morley, Harold Pinter Productions)
 The Winter’s Tale (1987) - Leontes (Nimrod)
 Orphans (1988) - Treat (Gary Penny Productions)
 The Cherry Orchard (1991) - Lapakhin (Queensland Theatre)
 Shadow & Splendour (1992) - Viktor Sager (Queensland Theatre)
 The Temple (1994) - Laurie Blake (Sydney Theatre Company)
 Macbeth (1994)- Macduff (Sydney Theatre Company)
 The Incorruptible (1995) - Ion Stafford (Playbox)
 Macbeth (1999) - Macbeth (Sydney Theatre Company)
 The School for Scandal (2001) - Sir Peter Teazle (Sydney Theatre Company)
 Dom Juan (2001) - (Sydney Theatre Company)
 Copenhagen (2002) - Heisenberg (Sydney Theatre Company)
 Victory (2004) - Charles II (Sydney Theatre Company)
 Zebra (2011) - Larry (Sydney Theatre Company)
 Red (2012) - Mark Rothko (Melbourne Theatre Company)
 Death of a Salesman (2012) - Willy Loman (Belvoir)
 Red (2013) - Mark Rothko (Queensland Theatre)
 Moving Parts (2013) - Sean (Revolver)
 Endgame (2015) - Hamm (Melbourne Theatre Company)
 Mortido (2015) - Detective Grubbe (Belvoir)
 Summer of the Seventeenth Doll (2015) - Roo (STCSA)
 Skylight (2016) - Tom Sergeant (Melbourne Theatre Company)
 Faith Healer (2016) - Francis Hardy (Belvoir)
 Dance of Death (2016) - Edgar (Belvoir / STCSA)
 Scaramouche Jones (2018) - Scaramouche Jones (Arts Centre Melbourne)
 Life of Galileo (2019) - Galileo Galilei (Belvoir)
 Hedda Gabler - Ejlert Løvborg (Sydney Theatre Company)
 Zastrossi - Zastrossi (Nimrod)
 Miss Julie / The Bear (Nimrod)
 Cloud 9 (Nimrod)
 Volpone (Sydney Theatre Company)
 Traitors - Rubin (Nimrod)
 American Buffalo - Bobby (STCSA)
 Hamlet - Laertes (STCSA)
 Oedipus the King (Part I & II) - Jocasta (STCSA)
 Family Love - The Son (STCSA)

Awards

Australian Film Institute Awards
 
|-
| 1986
| Colin Friels
| Best Actor in a Lead Role 
| 
|-
| 1987
| Colin Friels (for Ground Zero)
| Best Actor in a Lead Role
| 
|-
| 1991
| Colin Friels (for Dingo)
| Best Actor in a Lead Role
| 
|-
| 1995
| Colin Friels (for Halifax f.p.: Hard Corps)
| Best Performance by an Actor in a Television Drama
| 
|-
| 2004
| Colin Friels (for Tom White)
| Best Actor in a Lead Role
| 
|-

Film Critics Circle
 
|-
| 2004
| Colin Friels (for Tom White)
| Best Actor – Male 
| 
|-
|rowspan="2"|  2006
| Colin Friels (for Solo)
| Best Actor – Male 
| 
|-
| Colin Friels (for The Book of Revelation)
| Best Supporting Actor 
| 
|-

Helpmann Award
 
|-
| 2003
| Colin Friels (for Copenhagen)
| Best Male Actor
| 
|-

Logie  Awards
 
|-
| 1997
| Colin Friels (for Water Rats)
| Most Outstanding Actor
| 
|-
| 2000
| Colin Friels (for Water Rats)
| Most Outstanding Actor
| 
|-
| 2022
| Colin Friels (for Wakefield)
| Most Outstanding Supporting Actor
| 
|-

Mo Awards
The Australian Entertainment Mo Awards (commonly known informally as the Mo Awards), were annual Australian entertainment industry awards. They recognise achievements in live entertainment in Australia from 1975 to 2016. Colin Friels won one award in that time.
 (wins only)
|-
| 2002
| Colin Friels
| Male Actor in a Play
| 
|-

References

External links

1952 births
Australian male film actors
Australian people of Irish descent
Australian people of Scottish descent
Best Actor AACTA Award winners
Australian children's television presenters
Helpmann Award winners
Living people
Logie Award winners
National Institute of Dramatic Art alumni
People from Kilwinning
Scottish male film actors